Tai Chi Single Whip (or Taichi Single Whip) is an outdoor sculpture by Taiwanese artist Ju Ming, installed in Montreal's Victoria Square, in Quebec, Canada.

References

External links
 

Martial arts culture
Old Montreal
Outdoor sculptures in Montreal
Statues in Canada
Works by Taiwanese people